The Broad Economic Categories (BEC) is a three-digit classification, which groups transportable goods according to their main end use. It is most often used for the general economic analysis of international merchandise trade data. The BEC system is defined in terms of the Standard International Trade Classification system.

The original BEC was published in 1971, and revised in 1976, 1986 and most recently in 1988. The top level categories of the BEC are as follows:
 BEC-1: Food and beverages
 BEC-2: Industrial supplies not elsewhere specified
 BEC-3: Fuels and lubricants
 BEC-4: Capital goods (except transport equipment), and parts and accessories thereof
 BEC-5: Transport equipment and parts and accessories thereof
 BEC-6: Consumer goods not elsewhere specified
 BEC-7: Goods not elsewhere specified

In 2007 a fourth revision is under discussion, including a possible extension of the BEC to include tradable services.

See also
Harmonized System
Standard International Trade Classification

External links
United Nations Statistics Division

Economic taxonomy
International trade
United Nations documents